The Masked Tiger (Spanish:El tigre enmascarado) is a 1951 Mexican western film directed by Zacarías Gómez Urquiza and starring Luis Aguilar, Flor Silvestre and Aurora Segura.

The film's art direction was by Jorge Fernández.

Cast
 Luis Aguilar as Luis Landa, El tigre enmascarado  
 Flor Silvestre as Rosita  
 Aurora Segura as Rigoleta  
 Francisco Avitia as Don Pepe  
 Emma Roldán as Doña Rebeca  
 Pascual García Peña as Picardia  
 Carlos Valadez as El Cortado  
 Roberto G. Rivera 
 José L. Murillo as Justo  
 Agustín Fernández as Don Tomás 
 Victorio Blanco as Don Raúl  
 Rogelio Fernández as Espectador  
 Eufrosina García as Soledad  
 José René Ruiz as Enano

References

Bibliography 
 Pitts, Michael R. Western Movies: A Guide to 5,105 Feature Films. McFarland, 2012.

External links 
 

1951 films
1951 Western (genre) films
Mexican Western (genre) films
1950s Spanish-language films
Films directed by Zacarías Gómez Urquiza
Mexican black-and-white films
1950s Mexican films